Pinched is a 1917 American short comedy film starring Harold Lloyd. A print of the film is held by the Museum of Modern Art, and it has been released on DVD. Like many American films of the time, Pinched was subject to cuts by city and state film censorship boards. The Chicago Board of Censors required a cut of scene with a man thumbing his nose.

Cast

 Harold Lloyd as The Boy 
 Snub Pollard 
 Bebe Daniels 
 William Blaisdell
 Sammy Brooks
 Bud Jamison
 Margaret Joslin (credited as Margaret Joslin Todd)
 Gus Leonard
 Fred C. Newmeyer
 Charles Stevenson
 Dorothea Wolbert

Plot
The Boy is taking his sweetheart for a leisurely drive in an open automobile when his cap blows off his head and is carried by the wind into a nearby park.  When he goes to retrieve it, The Boy encounters an armed robber who steals his money.  The robber convinces a park policeman that The Boy was attempting to rob him.  This leads to a series of comic misunderstandings as The Boy tries to get his money back and prove his innocence.

See also
 Harold Lloyd filmography

References

External links

1917 films
1917 comedy films
1917 short films
American silent short films
American black-and-white films
Films directed by Harold Lloyd
Films directed by Gilbert Pratt
Silent American comedy films
American comedy short films
Censored films
1910s American films